Erich Büttner (7 October 1889 – 12 September 1936) was a German painter. From 1906 to 1911 he studied at the Unterrichtsanstalt des Kunstgewerbemuseums Berlin.
In 1908 he became a member of Berlin Secession.

Works 
Büttner's work is dominated by color and dynamic form of expressionism. In the 1920s he created a series of portraits of his friends and fellow artists including Lovis Corinth, George Grosz, Arno Holz and Heinrich Zille. He produced a very fine book of exlibris (bookplates) in Berlin 1921. This very rare book contains the exlibris of professor Dr. Albert Einstein 1917, probably Einstein's only bookplate. His work was part of the art competitions at the 1928 Summer Olympics and the 1932 Summer Olympics.

See also
 List of German painters

References

External links 
 
 Work by Büttner on the website of the MOMA

1889 births
1936 deaths
Artists from Berlin
20th-century German painters
20th-century German male artists
German male painters
Olympic competitors in art competitions